North Walpole is a census-designated place (CDP) in the town of Walpole in Cheshire County, New Hampshire, United States. It had a population of 785 at the 2020 census, making it the largest village in the town of Walpole.

It is located along New Hampshire Route 12 directly across the Connecticut River from the village of Bellows Falls, Vermont. North Walpole has a separate ZIP code (03609) from the rest of Walpole.

History
Spring snowmelt brought log drives down the Connecticut River. Log drivers were stationed to guide logs through a sluice over the dam at Bellows Falls. North Walpole offered twelve to eighteen saloons to quench log drivers' thirst. These spring drives were stopped after 1915, when pleasure boat owners complained about the hazards to navigation.

Geography
North Walpole is in the northwest corner of the town of Walpole, bordered to the south and west by the Connecticut River and to the north by the town of Charlestown in Sullivan County. The Arch Bridge leads from North Walpole across the Connecticut River to the village of Bellows Falls in Vermont.

Demographics

As of the census of 2010, there were 828 people, 340 households, and 216 families residing in the CDP. There were 387 housing units, of which 47, or 12.1%, were vacant. The racial makeup of the CDP was 96.3% white, 0.4% African American, 0.2% Native American, 0.2% Asian, 0.0% Native Hawaiian or Pacific Islander, 0.4% some other race, and 2.5% two or more races. 1.4% of the population were Hispanic or Latino of any race.

Of the 340 households in the CDP, 35.0% had children under the age of 18 living with them, 43.2% were headed by married couples living together, 14.1% had a female householder with no husband present, and 36.5% were non-families. 30.0% of all households were made up of individuals, and 10.5% were someone living alone who was 65 years of age or older. The average household size was 2.44, and the average family size was 3.02.

26.3% of residents in the CDP were under the age of 18, 7.0% were from age 18 to 24, 29.9% were from 25 to 44, 24.0% were from 45 to 64, and 12.7% were 65 years of age or older. The median age was 37.4 years. For every 100 females, there were 92.6 males. For every 100 females age 18 and over, there were 90.6 males.

For the period 2011-15, the estimated median annual income for a household was $71,739, and the median income for a family was $70,583. The per capita income for the CDP was $26,565. 8.9% of the population and 4.7% of families were below the poverty line, along with 9.1% of people under the age of 18 and 6.3% of people 65 or older.

Notable people
 Bill Jackowski (1914–1996), National League umpire from 1952 to 1968

References

Census-designated places in New Hampshire
Census-designated places in Cheshire County, New Hampshire
Walpole, New Hampshire